Halldóra Eyjólfsdóttir (died 1210;;) became the first abbess of Kirkjubæjar Abbey in 1189, three years after its foundation by Bishop Þorlákur Þórhallsson, and thereby the first abbess in Iceland.

Her family and origin is unknown, except for a brother (Sokki Eyjólfsson), who died in 1211. After her death in 1210, no other abbess is known of the convent until Agatha Helgadóttir in 1293.

References
 Anna Sigurðardóttir: Allt hafði annan róm áður í páfadóm. Nunnuklaustrin tvö á Íslandi og brot úr kristnisögu. Kvennasögusafn Íslands, Rvík 1988, 412 bls. Úr veröld kvenna 3.

12th-century Icelandic people
13th-century Icelandic people
1210 deaths
Year of birth unknown
12th-century Icelandic women
13th-century Icelandic women